In mathematics, a function  is superadditive if

Similarly, a sequence  is called superadditive if it satisfies the inequality

for all  and 

The term "superadditive" is also applied to functions from a boolean algebra to the real numbers where  such as lower probabilities.

Examples of superadditive functions

 The determinant is superadditive for nonnegative Hermitian matrix, that is, if  are nonnegative Hermitian then  This follows from the Minkowski determinant theorem, which more generally states that  is superadditive (equivalently, concave) for nonnegative Hermitian matrices of size : If  are nonnegative Hermitian then 
 Horst Alzer proved that Hadamard's gamma function  is superadditive for all real numbers  with 
 Mutual information

Properties

If  is a superadditive function whose domain contains  then  To see this, take the inequality at the top:  Hence 

The negative of a superadditive function is subadditive.

Fekete's lemma 

The major reason for the use of superadditive sequences is the following lemma due to Michael Fekete.

Lemma: (Fekete) For every superadditive sequence  the limit  is equal to the supremum   (The limit may be positive infinity, as is the case with the sequence  for example.)

The analogue of Fekete's lemma holds for subadditive functions as well.
There are extensions of Fekete's lemma that do not require the definition of superadditivity above to hold for all  and  
There are also results that allow one to deduce the rate of convergence to the limit whose existence is stated in Fekete's lemma if some kind of both superadditivity and subadditivity is present. A good exposition of this topic may be found in Steele (1997).

See also

References

Notes

 

Mathematical analysis
Sequences and series
Types of functions